This is a list of the National Register of Historic Places listings in Rock County, Minnesota.  It is intended to be a complete list of the properties and districts on the National Register of Historic Places in Rock County, Minnesota, United States.  The locations of National Register properties and districts for which the latitude and longitude coordinates are included below, may be seen in an online map.

There are 20 properties and districts listed on the National Register in the county.  A supplementary list includes two additional sites that were formerly on the National Register.

History
Rock County's National Register properties reflect its role as an agricultural region, served by a few population centers connected to eastern markets by railroads.  The first and largest community, Luverne, was established in 1867 and platted in 1872, a later start to settlement than most other parts of Minnesota.  Rail lines were constructed in the 1870s and 80s, directly influencing the placement of most of the rest of Rock County's towns.

The construction methods of Rock County's listings reveal the changing availability and fashion of building materials.  The oldest structures were of wood framing.  Increased investment is indicated by the use of brick, in such structures as the 1879 Pierce J. Kniss House and 1880 farmhouse at the Jacob Nuffer Farmstead.  Then, from the 1890s to 1905, locally quarried Sioux Quartzite became briefly fashionable, but its extreme hardness soon quashed its appeal among builders.

Current listings

|}

Former listings

|}

See also
 List of National Historic Landmarks in Minnesota
 National Register of Historic Places listings in Minnesota

References

External links

 Minnesota National Register Properties Database—Minnesota Historical Society

Rock County